Funny Girls is a New Zealand sitcom sketch comedy television series starring Rose Matafeo and Laura Daniel. It premiered on 23 October 2015 on Three.

Plot
The series follows Laura and Rose as they produce sketches for a fictional comedy series, fielding ideas from their male bosses and their producer Pauline.

Cast
 Rose Matafeo as Rose, a sketch comedy actress
 Laura Daniel as Laura, a sketch comedy actress
 Jackie van Beek as Pauline, Laura and Rose's producer
 Kimberley Crossman
 Antonia Prebble
 Teuila Blakely

Broadcast
The show premiered on 23 October 2015 on TV3. In 2016, the series returned for a second season. with six episodes. Actress Madeleine Sami made her television directorial debut.
Comedy Central was accused of ripping off an episode of the show. In 2018, the Prime Minister of New Zealand Jacinda Ardern appeared a sketch on the show about women's suffrage.

A third season ran in 2018 for six half-hour episodes.

Reception

Awards and nominations

References

2010s New Zealand television series
2010s television sketch shows
2015 New Zealand television series debuts
2018 New Zealand television series endings
New Zealand television sitcoms
Television shows funded by NZ on Air
Three (TV channel) original programming